|}

The Kinloch Brae Chase, currently run as the Horse & Jockey Hotel Chase, is a Grade 2 National Hunt steeplechase in Ireland. It is run at Thurles Racecourse in late January or early February, over a distance of about 2 miles and 4½ furlongs (2 miles 4 furlongs and 118 yards, or 4,131 metres) and during its running there are 14 fences to be jumped.

The race was first run in 1997. It was downgraded from Grade 2 to Grade 3 in 2017. and returned to Grade 2 status in 2018.

Records
Most successful horse (3 wins):
 Native Upmanship – (2002, 2003, 2004)

Leading jockey  (4 wins):
 Paul Townend - Quito De La Roque (2013), Real Steel (2020), Allaho (2021, 2022)

Leading trainer (4 wins):
 Arthur Moore -  Manhattan Castle (1998), Native Upmanship (2002, 2003, 2004) 
 Willie Mullins - Apt Approach (2012), Real Steel (2020), Allaho (2021, 2022)

Winners

See also
 Horse racing in Ireland
 List of Irish National Hunt races

References

Racing Post:

National Hunt races in Ireland
National Hunt chases
Thurles Racecourse